Boorman is a surname. Notable people with the surname include:

Aimee Boorman (born 1973), American artistic gymnastics coach
Arthur Boorman (born 1956), American professional wrestler, fitness instructor and actor
Charley Boorman, English actor, adventurer and travel writer
Derek Boorman, British Army officer and former Chief of Defence Intelligence
Emma Boorman, nineteenth-century artist who specialised in woodcuts
Imogen Boorman, English actress
James Boorman Colgate (1818–1904), American financier
John Boorman, English filmmaker
John Boorman (cricketer), English cricketer
Katrine Boorman (born 1958), English actress and director of film
Reg Boorman, New Zealand politician
Scott Boorman, American mathematical sociologist

See also
James Boorman Colgate, American financier
Borman
Bormann